Protostar (stylized as PROTOSTAR) is an extended play (EP) marketed as the debut single of Japanese boy group JO1, formed through the reality competition show Produce 101 Japan. It also served as the lead single for their first studio album The Star (2020). Consisting of songs previously performed on the last episode of the show and three new songs, the EP single was released by Lapone Entertainment into three different editions on March 4, 2020. It features the participation of various South Korean songwriters and production teams such as KZ, Kim Seung-soo, Nthonious, KCKT, Ryan S. Jhun, Andrew Choi, and others.

Upon its release, the single earned the top spot on Oricon Singles Chart and received a Platinum certification by the Recording Industry Association of Japan. It made the group became the seventh artist that managed to sell over 300,000 copies in the first week with a debut single according to Oricon. The lead track "Infinity" also peaked atop the Billboard Japan Hot 100.

Background and release 
Shortly after the end of Produce 101 Japan, JO1 was revealed to fly to South Korea for the preparation and the production of their debut. On January 14, it was revealed that the group's debut EP single was titled Protostar and would be released on March 4 with "Infinity" as the lead track. A concept trailer was released on January 28, 2020. To further promote the single, an animated music video for "Running" and a short performance video of "La Pa Pa Pam" were also released. A special live streaming event was then held on the group's various official social media accounts to commemorate the single's release and the group's debut, .

Protostar consists of songs previously performed on the last episode of the show and three new songs that were released into three different editions. The first edition is a CD and DVD bundle limited edition that includes a making video for "Infinity" and a talk segment with members. The second edition is a CD and photo booklet bundle limited edition. The final edition is a CD-only normal edition that includes the new songs: "Infinity", "Running", and "La Pa Pa Pam".

Lead track 
"Infinity" incorporates various musical components, such as hip hop, EDM, and house music. The song was aired for the first time on J-Wave's radio program, Step One, on February 5, 2020. The full version of the music video was released on February 16 and directed by Beomjin from VM Project Architecture. According to member Sho Yonashiro, Protostar implies the group's wish that they, who were ordinary people, gather and become stars, and "Infinity" is a song that embodies the infinite possibilities and infinite growth of JO1. 

Upon its release, "Infinity" led other songs from the EP single on the Billboard Japan Hot 100 by ranking first on that week and eventually earned the fiftieth place on the chart's year-end rankings. The song was used as the theme song for the TV commercial of ABC-Mart x Nike's project titled Nike One, as well as the ending song for TV Asahi's show, Sonna Koto Kangaetakoto Nakatta Quiz! Torinikku-tte Nanno Niku!?, and a Kansai TV's variety show Chihara Junior no Zao.

Promotion 
On March 24, 2020, JO1 had their first live performance ever on a TV program by performing "Infinity" on NTV's morning show Sukkiri. The group later presented  a special "home performance" of "La Pa Pa Pam" on Mezamashi Uchi Festival, a special episode of Fuji TV's Mezamashi TV due to the COVID-19 pandemic on May 4. The performance featured combined images of the members performing at their home and doing various activities at home. Subsequently, the group performed remotely on various TV shows, such as Love Music and NHK's Shibuya Note. On June 21, JO1 performed songs from the single in KCON:TACT 2020 Summer, making them the first Japanese boy group to ever participate in the convention.

Commercial performance 
Shortly after its release, Protostar peaked at number one on iTunes's real-time album charts in five regions in addition to Japan, such as Hong Kong and Taiwan. The single debuted at number one on Oricon Daily Singles Chart with an estimate of 215,409 copies sold. It remained at the top spot for seven consecutive days and ranked number one on the weekly chart with 327,187 sold, making JO1 the seventh artist that managed to sell over 300,000 copies sold in the first week with a debut single. It subsequently ranked third on the monthly chart, and received a Platinum certification by the Recording Industry Association of Japan for shipments of more than 250,000 units. Protostar eventually ranked sixth on Oricon's mid-year chart, and tenth on the Combined Singles Sales category. JO1 also ranked second on the New Artist Total Sales ranking by earning an estimate of 640 million yen from one single alone. By the end of 2020, the single ranked thirteenth on the 2020 Oricon Annual Ranking with 372,820 copies sold.

Protostar also debuted atop Billboard Japan Top Single Sales, and ranked eighth on the mid-year edition of the chart. That achievement helped the group to rank on Billboard Japan 2020 Mid-Year Top Artists, a chart that combines points from Japan Hot 100 and Japan Hot Albums for the first half of 2020. The single eventually ranked fourteenth on the chart's annual edition.

Track listing 
"Infinity" and "Tsukame" are common track 1 and 4, respectively, for all editions.

Charts

Weekly charts

Monthly charts

Year-end charts

Certifications

Release history

References 

JO1 songs
2020 songs
2020 singles
Billboard Japan Hot 100 number-one singles
Japanese-language songs
Oricon Weekly number-one singles